Otter Lake is a lake in the community of Elcho in Langlade County, Wisconsin, United States. The Hunting River flows from the lake. The name is a direct translation of indigenous names for the lake, such as the Menominee name Mekēk-Nepēhsaeh.

References

Lakes of Langlade County, Wisconsin